The Lady Byng Memorial Trophy, formerly known as the Lady Byng Trophy, is presented each year to the National Hockey League "player adjudged to have exhibited the best type of sportsmanship and gentlemanly conduct combined with a high standard of playing ability". The Lady Byng Memorial Trophy has been awarded 88 times to 53 different players since it was first awarded in 1925. The original trophy was donated to the league by Lady Byng of Vimy, then–viceregal consort of Canada.

The voting is conducted at the end of the regular season by members of the Professional Hockey Writers Association, and each individual voter ranks their top five candidates on a 10-7-5-3-1 points system. Three finalists are named and the trophy is awarded at the NHL Awards ceremony after the Stanley Cup Playoffs.

History
The trophy is named in honour of Marie Evelyn Moreton (Lady Byng), wife of the Viscount Byng of Vimy, who commanded Canadian forces at the Battle of Vimy Ridge and who was Governor General of Canada from 1921 to 1926. Lady Byng, an avid hockey fan, decided to donate the trophy to the NHL in 1924–25.

Lady Byng decided the trophy's first winner would be Frank Nighbor of the original Ottawa Senators. Late in the season, she invited Nighbor to Rideau Hall, showed him the trophy, and asked him if the NHL would accept it as an award for its most gentlemanly player. When Nighbor said he thought it would, Lady Byng, much to Nighbor's surprise, awarded him the trophy.

After Frank Boucher of the New York Rangers won the award seven times within eight years, Lady Byng was so impressed that she gave him the original trophy to keep. She then donated a second trophy in 1935–36. When Lady Byng died in 1949, the NHL presented another trophy and changed the official name to the Lady Byng Memorial Trophy. In 1962, the original trophy was destroyed in a fire at Boucher's home.

Award winners
Besides Boucher, a number of players have won the award multiple times, including Wayne Gretzky who won it five times, Red Kelly and Pavel Datsyuk with four wins, and Bobby Bauer, Alex Delvecchio, Mike Bossy, Martin St. Louis, and Ron Francis with three each. Because of Boucher's seven wins, the New York Rangers join Detroit as the only two clubs who have won the award fourteen times, followed by Toronto with nine wins, Chicago and Boston tied with eight, and Los Angeles with six. Adam Oates was a six-time finalist for the Lady Byng Trophy but never won.

Five players have won both the Lady Byng Trophy and the Hart Memorial Trophy as league MVP in the same season: Buddy O'Connor  (1947–48), Bobby Hull (1964–65), Stan Mikita (1966–67 and 1967–68), Wayne Gretzky (1979–80) and Joe Sakic (2000–01). Mikita is also the only player to win the Hart, Art Ross, and Lady Byng trophies in the same season, doing so consecutively in the 1966–67 and 1967–68 seasons. Gretzky, Bobby Hull, and Martin St. Louis also won these three awards, but not in the same season. Bobby and Brett Hull are the only father–son combination to win the Hart and Lady Byng trophies.

Bill Quackenbush, Jaccob Slavin, Red Kelly, and Brian Campbell are the only defensemen to have won the Lady Byng Trophy, with Kelly being the only one to win it multiple times (three as a defenseman; four overall). After Kelly, no defenseman won the award for a 58-year stretch, which ended in 2012 when Campbell received the honor, although Nicklas Lidström narrowly lost to Joe Sakic in 2001. No goaltender has ever won the award.

List of winners

See also
List of National Hockey League awards
List of NHL players
Violence in sports
NHL violence
List of awards presented by the Governor General of Canada
List of awards named after Governors General of Canada

References

General
 
Lady Byng Memorial Trophy at NHL.com
Lady Byng Memorial Trophy history at Legends of Hockey.net
Specific

Awards established in 1925
National Hockey League trophies and awards
Sportsmanship trophies and awards